Clyde Boats was a small, privately owned, custom boat company located in Detroit, Michigan. For nearly fifty years it produced custom mahogany motorboats for clients in the Great Lakes area.

The early years
Clyde Boats was founded in 1928 in the living room of founder Clyde Rummney's Michigan home near the shores of Lake St. Clair. Mr. Rummney's first boats were small rowboats made primarily for himself and friends. By the early 1930s Mr. Rummney had relocated to Gibraltar, Michigan, and soon began renting space in a small building on Livernois Avenue in Detroit where he switched from row boats to producing custom-order mahogany boats with outboard engines.

Clyde Boats were soon available in three sizes; 12', 14', and 16'. Each boat began as a wooden "tub" constructed of moulded plywood and built by fishermen in Nova Scotia. Some were Ashcroft hulls, with the inner and outer layer running on the same bias, overlapping the seams, while others were cold molded hulls. The boats were soon known for their speed, compared to other boats of their size. The secret was 5 Ply Moulded Marine Aircraft Birch, which was very light, and strong. At the Clyde factory the keel was added, then the boat would be completed using the customer's choice of accessories. At first, all boats were made to order, with no "tub" or supplies purchased until an order was placed, but by World War II the company had begun using the winter months when business was slow to construct boats to a factory standard that could be sold as factory models, or finished with additional details of the customer's choosing.

By the start of World War II Clyde Boats was building and selling around 40 boats a month. The factory building was soon purchased by Clyde Rummney. While competitors like Chris-Craft moved to larger production facilities and greater output, Clyde Boats remained small, with only three or four employees. Clyde Rummney himself did most of the designing, building, and selling of his products. Little effort was made to promote Clyde Boats beyond the Detroit area. The small size and exclusive nature of the company's products was attractive to many of its clients, and helped Clyde Boats maintain its reputation for exclusive, custom-made mahogany boats for the wealthy. It also kept overhead to a minimum, and, as the company's prices rose, so too did its profits.

The war years
Unlike its competitors, Clyde Boats did no military work during World War II. Its small size left it unattractive for military contracts and allowed the company to continue producing the exclusive mahogany boats its customers demanded, while other companies that relied on higher output were forced to produce military products because of reduced consumer demand. On the contrary, demand for Clyde Boats actually rose during the War years due to the unavailability of boats from other manufacturers. By the end of World War II Clyde Rummney was forced to move his company to a larger production facility down the road at 8600 Livernois Avenue, which he purchased outright.

Post war years
By the early 1950s Clyde Boats was secure in its position as a unique custom boat builder in the Detroit area. Its clientele were often repeat buyers, purchasing their second or third Clyde boats. The company continued to manufacture the same 12', 14' and 16' models, though each continued to be produced with unique details to satisfy the customer's demands. The diversity of outboard engines also meant greater power was available, though many Clyde Boats were purchased without engines, which were added later by the owner. A small number of standard models built during the winter continued to be available.

Closing
Clyde Boats continued its operations, using largely the same methods and tools right up until its closing in 1971. Like many cottage businesses, it closed its doors with the retirement of its owner, Clyde Rummney, who lived only two more years after the closing, and died in 1973.

Markings
All Clyde Boats were finished in natural mahogany. None were ever painted at the factory. The Company's logo was a flying seagull with the word "CLYDE" in block letters across it.

Survivors
Never common, even in the Detroit area, Clyde Boats are very rare today. Total production figures have been lost, but the company claimed to have built over 10,000 boats total from 1928 until closing in 1971.

See also

References

External links
 1961 Clyde 16 foot
 "1965 CLYDE 16'." (Archived boat profile, with images and details.)

Boats
Motorboats
American boat builders
Vehicle manufacturing companies established in 1928
Privately held companies based in Michigan
1928 establishments in Michigan
Vehicle manufacturing companies disestablished in 1971
1971 disestablishments in Michigan
Defunct manufacturing companies based in Detroit